The Sabak Bernam District is a district and a parliamentary constituency in north-western Selangor, Malaysia. It covers an area of 997 square kilometres, and had a population of 103,153 at the 2010 Census (excluding foreigns). It is situated at the northwestern corner of Selangor. It is bordered by the state of Perak to the north, the district of Hulu Selangor to the east, the district of Kuala Selangor to the south, and the Straits of Malacca to the west. Bernam River forms its border with Perak. Towns in Sabak Bernam include Sabak, Sungai Besar and Sekinchan. This area is also famous for its residents of Javanese descent.

The district is mainly a rice growing area. As such, Sabak Bernams' main economic activity is agriculture. Sabak Bernam is the westernmost district of Selangor; at 100 km from Kuala Lumpur, Sabak Bernam is the furthest district in Selangor from both Kuala Lumpur and state capital Shah Alam.

Administrative divisions

Sabak Bernam District is divided into 5 mukims, which are:
 Bagan Nakhoda Omar
 Panchang Bendena
 Pasir Panjang
 Sabak
 Sungai Panjang

Demographics

Federal Parliament and State Assembly Seats

List of Sabak Bernam district representatives in the Federal Parliament (Dewan Rakyat) 

List of Sabak Bernam district representatives in the State Legislative Assembly (Dewan Negeri Selangor)

See also
 Districts of Malaysia

References